Richland Township is one of 13 townships in Grant County, Indiana, United States. As of the 2010 census, its population was 966 and it contained 431 housing units.

Geography
The stream of Taylor Creek runs through this township.

Cities and towns
 Converse (east quarter)
 Sweetser (west edge)

Unincorporated towns
 Mier
(This list is based on USGS data and may include former settlements.)

Adjacent townships
 Liberty Township, Wabash County (northeast)
 Pleasant Township (east)
 Franklin Township (southeast)
 Sims Township (south)
 Jackson Township, Howard County (southwest)
 Jackson Township, Miami County (west)
 Waltz Township, Wabash County (northwest)

Cemeteries
The township contains several cemeteries, one active, the Independent Order of Odd Fellows.  It also contains the Pence and the Drook cemeteries, both on private land.  William Robert Taylor for whom Taylor Creek in named, is likely buried in the Drook Cemetery. His wife Mary was the first burial in the Pence cemetery.

Major highways

Education
Richland Township residents may obtain a free library card from the Converse-Jackson Township Public Library in Converse.

References
 U.S. Board on Geographic Names (GNIS)
 United States Census Bureau cartographic boundary files

External links
 Indiana Township Association
 United Township Association of Indiana

Townships in Grant County, Indiana
Townships in Indiana